Howard R. Slater (July 12, 1917 – September 6, 1987) was an American lawyer and politician.

Slater was born in Brooklyn, in New York City, New York. He graduated from Boy High School in Brooklyn and received his law degree from Columbia Law School. Slater also went to the Northwestern University. Slater worked in the United States Department of Agriculture in the Surplus Marketing Administration. He then served in the United States Army during World War II and was commissioned a lieutenant in the transportation corps. Slater lived in Highland Park, Illinois, with his wife and family and practiced law in Chicago, Illinois. He served in the Illinois House of Representatives in 1965 and 1966 and was a Democrat. He died at the Rush-Presbyterian-St. Luke's Medical Center in Chicago, Illinois.

Notes

1917 births
1987 deaths
Lawyers from Brooklyn
Politicians from Brooklyn
Lawyers from Chicago
Politicians from Chicago
People from Highland Park, Illinois
Military personnel from New York City
United States Department of Agriculture people
Columbia Law School alumni
Democratic Party members of the Illinois House of Representatives
United States Army personnel of World War II